Python Bridge, officially known as High Bridge (Hoge Brug), is a bridge that spans the canal between Sporenburg and Borneo Island in Eastern Docklands, Amsterdam. It was built in 2001 and won the International Footbridge Award in 2002. The bright red bridge spans 90 meters and was designed by Adriaan Geuze of the architectural firm West 8. The bridge only carries pedestrians.

The visually similar Lage Brug (Low bridge) is nearby. It is similar but without the high elevation, which allows cyclists to ride over it.

References 

Bridges completed in 2001
Pedestrian bridges in the Netherlands
Steel bridges in the Netherlands
Bridges in Amsterdam
Tourist attractions in Amsterdam